Loriini is a tribe of small to medium-sized arboreal parrots characterized by their specialized brush-tipped tongues for feeding on nectar of various blossoms and soft fruits, preferably berries. The species form a monophyletic group within the parrot family Psittaculidae. The group consists of the lories and lorikeets. Traditionally, they were considered a separate subfamily (Loriinae) from the other subfamily (Psittacinae) based on the specialized characteristics, but recent molecular and morphological studies show that the group is positioned in the middle of various other groups. They are widely distributed throughout the Australasian region, including south-eastern Asia, Polynesia, Papua New Guinea, Timor Leste and Australia, and the majority have very brightly coloured plumage.

Etymology
The word "lory" comes from the Malay lūri, a name used for a number of species of colourful parrots. The name was used by the Dutch writer Johan Nieuhof in 1682 in a book describing his travels in the East Indies.
The spelling "laurey" was used by English naturalist Eleazar Albin in 1731 for a species of parrot from Brazil,
and then in 1751 the English naturalist George Edwards used the spelling "lory" when introducing names for five species of parrot from the East Indies in the fourth volume of his A Natural History of Uncommon Birds. Edwards credited Nieuhof for the name.

The choice of the terms "lory" and "lorikeet" is subjective, like the use of "parrot" and "parakeet". Species with longer tapering tails are generally referred to as "lorikeets", while species with short blunt tails are generally referred to as "lories".

Taxonomy
Traditionally, lories and lorikeets have either been classified as the subfamily, Loriinae, or as a family on their own, Loriidae, but they are currently classified as a tribe. Neither traditional view is confirmed by molecular studies. Those studies show that the lories and lorikeets form a single group, closely related to the budgerigar and the fig parrots (Cyclopsitta and Psittaculirostris).

A comprehensive molecular phylogenetic study of the Loriini published in 2020 led to major changes in the generic boundaries. The reorganisation involved the resurrection of four genera: Charminetta, Hypocharmosyna, Charmosynopsis and Glossoptilus, as well as the erection of three entirely new genera: Synorhacma, Charmosynoides and Saudareos. One genus disappeared, as the collared lory, which had previously been placed in the monotypic genus Phigys, was found to be embedded in the genus Vini. The extinct New Caledonian lorikeet, although not sampled, was assumed to be a member of the genus Vini on plumage and biogeographic grounds. The tribe Loriini now contains 61 species divided into 19 genera.

Genera

Morphology

Lories and lorikeets have specialized brush-tipped tongues for feeding on nectar and soft fruits. They can feed from the flowers of about 5,000 species of plants and use their specialized tongues to take the nectar. The tip of their tongues have tufts of papillae (extremely fine hairs), which collect nectar and pollen.

The multi-coloured rainbow lorikeet was one of the species of parrots appearing in the first edition of The Parrots of the World and also in John Gould's lithographs of the Birds of Australia. Then and now, lories and lorikeets are described as some of the most beautiful species of parrot.

Diet

In the wild, rainbow lorikeets feed mainly on pollen and nectar, and possess a tongue adapted especially for their particular diet. Many fruit orchard owners consider them a pest, as they often fly in groups and strip trees containing fresh fruit. They are also frequent visitors at bird feeders that supply lorikeet-friendly treats, such as store-bought nectar, sunflower seeds, and fruits such as apples, grapes and pears. Occasionally they have been observed feeding on meat.

Conservation

The ultramarine lorikeet is endangered. It is now one of the 50 rarest birds in the world. The blue lorikeet is classified as vulnerable.  The introduction of European rats to the small island habitats of these birds is a major cause of their endangerment.  Various conservation efforts have been made to relocate some of these birds to locations free of predation and habitat destruction.

In literature
A "Lory" famously appears in Chapter III of Lewis Carroll's Alice's Adventures in Wonderland. Alice argues with the Lory about its age.

Gallery

References

External links

ARKive - images and movies of the blue lorikeet/tahitian lory (Vini peruviana)

Taxa named by Prideaux John Selby